The Caulfield Cup is a Melbourne Racing Club Group 1 Thoroughbred horse race held under handicap conditions, although the Melbourne Racing Club is in the process of turning the race into weight for age (WFA) conditions. This is for all horses aged three years old and older. It takes place over a distance of 2400 metres at the Caulfield Racecourse, Melbourne, Australia in mid October. The prize money is A$5,000,000.

History
The race has become one of Australia's richest Thoroughbred horse races. The race is held annually on the third Saturday in October, the third day and final day of the Caulfield Carnival. Performances in the Caulfield Cup are one of the possible qualification methods for a run in the Melbourne Cup which is held 16 days later.

During World War II the race was run at Flemington Racecourse and in 1943 the race was run in divisions.

Race qualification
The field is limited to 18 starters with four emergency entries which is decided by a ballot system. The prize money, wins and placings in lead up races are among the major factors that determine the eligibility of a horse.
Automatic entry is awarded to winners of the Toorak Handicap, Herbert Power Stakes and the Mornington Cup.

Sponsors
1985–1999 - Foster's
2000–2005 - Carlton Draught
2006–2013 - BMW
2014 - Crown Golden Ale
2015–2017 - BMW
2018–2020 - Stella Artois
2021-current - Carlton Draught

Distance
1879–1971 - 1 miles (~2400 meters)
1972 onwards - 2400 meters

Grade
1879–1978 - Principal Race
1979 onwards - Group 1

Dual Winners
The following thoroughbreds have won two Caulfield Cups.
 Paris (1892, 1894), Hymettus (1898, 1901), Poseidon (1906–07), Uncle Sam (1912, 1914), Whittier (1922, 1925), Rising Fast (1954-1955) and Ming Dynasty (1977, 1980).

Caulfield-Melbourne Cup Double Wins
The following thoroughbreds have won the Caulfield-Melbourne Cup double in the same year.
 Poseidon (1906), The Trump (1937), Rivette (1939), Rising Fast (1954), Even Stevens (1962), Galilee (1966), Gurner's Lane (1982), Let’s Elope (1991), Doriemus (1995), Might and Power (1997) and Ethereal (2001).

Notable runnings
 Australian Test cricketer Clem Hill was the handicapper for the Victoria Amateur Turf Club (VATC) and responsible for setting the weights for the Caulfield Cup from 1937 to 1943.
 Jockey Scobie Breasley rode the winner of four consecutive Caulfield Cups from 1942 to 1945. This included a division of the 1943 race, which was run in two divisions. He also holds the record for most wins by a jockey of the race - five wins.
 Trainer Bart Cummings holds the record for training Caulfield Cup winners with seven - Galilee, Big Philou, Leilani, Ming Dynasty (twice), Let's Elope and Viewed.
 2014 Caulfield Cup winner Admire Rakti died after his run in the Melbourne Cup from natural causes.
 Horses trained outside Australia and New Zealand have been participating in the race since 1998. Six have won the race. They are Taufan's Melody (1998) for British trainer Lady Herries, All the Good (2008) and Best Solution (2018) for Saeed bin Suroor of the Godolphin stables, Dunaden (2012) for French trainer Mikel Delzangles, Admire Rakti (2014) for Japanese trainer Tomoyuki Umeda and Mer De Glace (2019) for Japanese trainer Hisashi Shimizu.
 The worst race fall in Australian history occurred at the 1885 Caulfield Cup when 15 of the 44 horses competing fell as they turned onto the straight, resulting in the death of 25-year-old jockey Donald Nicholson.
 In 2007, Maldivian and Eskimo Queen were late scratchings. Maldivian, shortest price favourite for 41 years, misbehaved and injured himself in the starting stalls, frightening second priced favourite Eskimo Queen who for a time was trapped beneath the stalls. The race started almost nine minutes late.

1924 & 1934 Racebooks

1950 Racebook

Winners since 1988

Earlier winners

1987 - Lord Reims
1986 - Mr. Lomondy
1985 - Tristarc
1984 - Affinity
1983 - Hayai
1982 - Gurner's Lane 
1981 - Silver Bounty
1980 - Ming Dynasty
1979 - Mighty Kingdom
1978 - Taksan
1977 - Ming Dynasty 
1976 - How Now
1975 – Analight
1974 - Leilani 
1973 - Swell Time
1972 - Sobar
1971 - Gay Icarus
1970 - Beer Street
1969 - ¶ Big Philou 
1968 - Bunratty Castle
1967 - Tobin Bronze 
1966 - Galilee 
1965 - Bore Head 
1964 - Yangtze
1963 - Sometime
1962 - Even Stevens
1961 - Summer Fair
1960 - Ilumquh
1959 - Regal Wench
1958 - Sir Blink
1957 - Tulloch
1956 - Redcraze
1955 - Rising Fast
1954 - Rising Fast
1953 - My Hero
1952 - Peshawar
1951 - Basha Felika
1950 - Grey Boots
1949 - Lincoln
1948 - Red Fury
1947 - Columnist
1946 - Royal Gem 
1945 - St. Fairy
1944 - Counsel
1943 - † Saint Warden / Skipton
1942 - Tranquil Star 
1941 - Velocity
1940 - Beaulivre
1939 - Rivette
1938 - Buzalong
1937 - The Trump 
1936 - Northwind
1935 - Palfresco
1934 - Journal
1933 - Gaine Carrington
1932 - Rogilla 
1931 - Denis Boy
1930 - Amounis 
1929 - High Syce
1928 - Maple
1927 - Textile
1926 - Manfred
1925 - Whittier
1924 - Purser
1923 - Wynette
1922 - Whittier
1921 - Violoncello
1920 - Eurythmic 
1919 - Lucknow
1918 - King Offa
1917 - Bronzetti
1916 - Shepherd King
1915 - Lavendo
1914 - Uncle Sam
1913 - Aurifer
1912 - Uncle Sam
1911 - Lady Medallist
1910 - Flavinius
1909 - ‡ Blue Book / Aborigine
1908 - Maranui
1907 - Poseidon
1906 - Poseidon 
1905 - Marvel Loch
1904 - Murmur
1903 - Sweet Nell
1902 - Lieutenant Bill
1901 - Hymettus
1900 - Ingliston
1899 - Dewey
1898 - Hymettus
1897 - Amberite
1896 - Cremorne
1895 - Waterfall
1894 - Paris  
1893 - ¶ Sainfoin
1892 - Paris  
1891 - G'naroo
1890 - Vengeance
1889 - Boz
1888 - Chicago
1887 - Oakleigh
1886 - Ben Bolt
1885 - Grace Darling 
1884 - Blink Bonny
1883 - Calma
1882 - Little Jack
1881 - Master Avenel
1881 - Blue Ribbon
1880 - Tom Kirk
1879 - Newminster

Key:
† Run in divisions
¶ Won by Protest
‡ Dead heat

Attendance
2021 – 0 (no public attendance due to COVID-19 pandemic restrictions)
2020 – 0 (no public attendance due to COVID-19 pandemic restrictions)

2019 – 28,000
2018 – 30,000
2017 – 30,000
2015 – 30,000
2014 – 32,000
2013 – 33,056
2012 – 35,500
2011 – 30,097
2010 – 23,697
2009 – 43,210
2008 – 51,328
2007 – 48,529
2006 – 47,551
2005 – 52,000
2004 – 51,015
2003 – 46,873

Sponsorship 
In March 2015, BMW Australia and the Melbourne Racing Club announced a reunion in partnership, effective as of August 1, 2015 after the eight-year partnership ended in 2014.

See also
 List of Australian Group races
 Group races

External links
 Caulfield Cup placegetters since 1949

References

Open middle distance horse races
Group 1 stakes races in Australia
Caulfield Racecourse
Caulfield Cup winners
Recurring sporting events established in 1879
Sports competitions in Melbourne